Ruben Kristiansen (born 20 February 1988) is a Norwegian international footballer who plays professionally for SK Brann, as a left back.

Career
Kristiansen hails from Nordreisa. He has played club football for Skjervøy, Tromsdalen and Tromsø. He signed for Vålerenga in March 2014.

He made his international debut for Norway in 2013.

Career statistics

References

1988 births
Living people
People from Nordreisa
Norwegian footballers
Norway international footballers
Tromsdalen UIL players
Tromsø IL players
Vålerenga Fotball players
SK Brann players
Eliteserien players
Norwegian First Division players
Norwegian Second Division players
Association football fullbacks
Sportspeople from Troms og Finnmark